Suppressor of cytokine signaling 5 is a protein that in humans is encoded by the SOCS5 gene.

The protein encoded by this gene contains a SH2 domain and a SOCS BOX domain. The protein thus belongs to the suppressor of cytokine signaling (SOCS) family, also known as STAT-induced STAT inhibitor (SSI) protein family. SOCS family members are known to be cytokine-inducible negative regulators of cytokine signaling. The specific function of this protein has not yet been determined. Two alternatively spliced transcript variants encoding an identical protein have been reported.

References

Further reading